Interstate 76 Business or Business Interstate 76 may refer to the following Business Interstate Highways that connect to Interstate 76:

Interstate 76 Business (Fort Morgan–Sterling, Colorado)
Interstate 76 Business (Keenesburg, Colorado)
Interstate 76 Connector, an unsigned business route in Camden, New Jersey

76
76